Langit sa Piling Mo (International title: Heaven with You / ) is a 2010 Philippine television drama romance series broadcast by GMA Network. Directed by Gil Tejada, Jr., it stars Heart Evangelista and Mark Herras. It premiered on May 31, 2010 on the network's Telebabad line up replacing  First Time. The series concluded on September 17, 2010 with a total of 80 episodes. It was replaced by Bantatay in its timeslot.

Production
Airport scenes were filmed at Ninoy Aquino International Airport Terminal 3 in Pasay.

Cast and characters

Lead cast
 Heart Evangelista as Margarita "Marj" Rosales / Marietta Flores
 Mark Herras as Rodrigo "Rigo" Hilario III / Thirdy

Supporting cast
 JC Tiuseco as Jerry Narciso
 Daniel Matsunaga as Xavier Cruz
 Katrina Halili as Aurora Ty
 Arci Muñoz as Melanie Tecson
 Tonton Gutierrez as Stanley Ty
 Maritoni Fernandez as Gloria Hilario
 Joonee Gamboa as Rodrigo Hilario Sr.
 Sylvia Sanchez as Mely Rosales
 Jay Aquitania as Felix Flores
 Ryza Cenon as Candy / Joy Flores
 Marky Lopez as Jay de Guzman
 Say Alonzo as Pacita "Cita" Alonzo
 Joanne Quintas as Bianca Quimpo
 Evelyn Vargas as Evangeline Amparo
 Philip Lazaro as Pebbles Manalo
 Soliman Cruz as Ador Pinlac
 Carlo Gonzales as William Jimenez
 Marco Morales as Warren Tuazon

Guest cast
 Ricardo Cepeda as Rodrigo "Rod" Hilario Jr.
 Sheryl Cruz as Alma Flores
 Rey "PJ" Abellana as Juanito Flores
 Sheena Halili as Bernadette "Berna" Soriano
 Dex Quindoza as King
 Stef Prescott as Jenny / fake Joy
 Sandy Talag as young Marietta
 Miguel Tanfelix as young Thirdy
 Ella Guevara as young Aurora
 Elijah Magundayao as young Felix
 Mikaela Dimaculangan as young Joy
 Hansen Nichols as Frank Salas
 Jen Rosendahl as Jennifer Salas

Ratings
According to AGB Nielsen Philippines' Mega Manila People/Individual television ratings, the final episode scored a 9% rating.

References

External links
 

2010 Philippine television series debuts
2010 Philippine television series endings
Aviation television series
Filipino-language television shows
GMA Network drama series
Philippine romance television series
Television shows set in the Philippines